Kay Clark-Miculek is an American sport shooter 
with two IPSC Handgun World Shoot gold medals in the Open division Lady category (1993 and 1996) and one silver medal (2005). She has two gold medals from the IPSC US Handgun Championship, eight gold and one silver medal from the USPSA Handgun Nationals, and 7 times top woman in the Steel Challenge World Speed Shooting Championships and three time Steel Challenge World Speed Shooting Champion (1998, 1991 and 1987).

Kay is wife of Jerry Miculek and mother of their daughter Lena Miculek.

References

Living people
IPSC shooters
Year of birth missing (living people)